The EMD FT36CW-2, classified as the Class 7000 locomotive under Korail, was a Korean semi-high-speed diesel locomotive. It was built to make the Saemaul Class trains more streamlined before the 1988 Olympics. The locomotives were built between 1986 and 1987 and were all retired between 2011 and 2012 when they reached the end of their 25-year lifespans.

Specifications 
The FT36HCW-2 is only capable of hauling passenger cars.

The braking system is of an electric type, unlike the air brakes used on the larger GT26CW and GT26CW2 diesel-electric locomotives. However, dynamic braking was prohibited from use due to the aging of the traction motors.

The cab only had windows on one side of the train, so it was hard to see in the other side of the train. Therefore, the top speed when driving in slower speeds was limited to 25 km/h.

History 
 June 1986: Units 7001-7009 are introduced into service.
 July 1987: Units 7010-7015 are introduced into service. These units had several slight changes.
 2011: Units 7001-7009 are retired. Unit 7001 is slated for preservation.
 November 28, 2012: Units 7010-7015 are retired.

Modifications 
The FT36HCW-2s were equipped with head-end power (HEP). However, the power supply caused many problems, and excessive noise and frequent maintenance led to the decision by Korail to remove HEP from the cars and instead use dynamo cars to provide the head-end power.

The locomotives also were originally powered by EMD 16-645F3B 3500-horsepower engines, but were eventually repowered with more efficient 3000-horsepower EMD 16-645E3 to satisfy passengers and customers.

The front coupler was initially housed, but was converted to an external convex to resolve efficiency problems.

Trains and statuses 
There were fifteen FT36HCW-2 locomotives, all of which were classified as Class 7000 locomotives. A detailed list of the fifteen units is below.

References

FT36HCW-2
Co-Co locomotives
Diesel locomotives of South Korea
Railway locomotives introduced in 1986
Standard gauge locomotives of South Korea